The 1982 East Carolina Pirates football team was an American football team that represented East Carolina University as an independent during the 1982 NCAA Division I-A football season. In their third season under head coach Ed Emory, the team compiled a 7–4 record.

Schedule

References

East Carolina
East Carolina Pirates football seasons
East Carolina Pirates football